Season twenty-seven of the television program American Experience originally aired on the PBS network in the United States on January 6, 2015 and concluded on November 24, 2015.  The season contained 11 new episodes and began with the film Ripley: Believe It or Not.

Episodes

References

2015 American television seasons

American Experience